The Priests of Psi (1980) is a collection of five short stories written by science fiction author Frank Herbert.  All of the works had been previously published in magazine or book form.

Contents
"Old Rambling House" - short story - Galaxy Science Fiction 1958
"Murder Will In" - novelette - Five Fates, Doubleday 1970
"The Priests of Psi" - novella - Fantastic Science Fiction Stories 1960
"Try to Remember!" - novelette - Amazing Stories 1961
"Mindfield!" - novelette - Amazing Stories 1962

External links
DuneNovels.com ~ Official site of Dune and Herbert Limited Partnership

1980 short story collections
Short story collections by Frank Herbert
Victor Gollancz Ltd books